Bride Wars is a 2015 Chinese romantic comedy film directed by Tony Chan. The film is a remake of 2009's Bride Wars that starred Kate Hudson and Anne Hathaway. It was released in China on August 20, 2015.

Plot
A pair of brides-to-be put their friendship to the test when they battle it out for the perfect wedding scheduled on the same day.

Cast
Ni Ni as Ma Li
Angelababy as He Jing
Zhu Yawen as Luo Dan
Chen Xiao as Kevin
He Jiong as Alexander 
Liu Jinshan as Ma Li's father
Wang Yinan as Xiao Bai
Xi Wang as Xiao Rou
Huang Xiaoming as Groom in the opening (Cameo)
Feng Shaofeng as Priest (Cameo)
Jing Boran as TV Host (Cameo)
Du Haitao as Leading workman (Cameo)

Reception

Box office
The film came in at number three in its opening weekend, earning US$24,220,000 (RMB $154,496,958). In its second weekend the film dropped to number seven with $3.34 million. Its two-week total now stands at $27.6 million.

Critical response

Maggie Lee of Variety said that "a not-great Hollywood romantic comedy gets even worse in this atrocious Chinese remake." Elizabeth Kerr of The Hollywood Reporter called the film "a facile and uninspired remake of a facile and uninspired original."

References

External links

 

2015 romantic comedy films
Chinese romantic comedy films
Polybona Films films
Films set in Shanghai
Films shot in Shanghai
Chinese remakes of foreign films
Films about weddings
2010s Mandarin-language films